Wastell is a surname. Notable people with the surname include:

Robert Wastell (fl. 1406–1410), English politician
John Wastell ( 1460— 1518), English architect and mason